Lea County is a county located in the U.S. state of New Mexico. As of the 2010 census, its population was 64,727. 

Its county seat is Lovington. It is both west and north of the Texas state line. Lea County comprises the Hobbs, NM micropolitan statistical area.

Geography
Lea County is located in the southeast corner of New Mexico and borders Texas to the south and east.

It produces 500,000 barrels of crude a day, and this number was expected to double in 2019.

Adjacent counties

 Roosevelt County – north
 Chaves County – northwest
 Eddy County – west
 Loving County, Texas – south
 Winkler County, Texas – southeast
 Andrews County, Texas – east
 Gaines County, Texas – east
 Yoakum County, Texas – east
 Cochran County, Texas – northeast

Demographics

2000 census
As of the 2000 census,  55,511 people, 19,699 households, and 14,715 families were living in the county. The population density was 13 people per square mile (5/km2). The 23,405 housing units averaged 5 per mi2 (2/km2). The racial makeup of the county was 67.13% White, 4.37% African American, 0.99% Native American, 0.39% Asian,  23.85% from other races, and 3.27% from two or more races. About 39.65% of the population were Hispanic or Latino of any race.

Of the 19,699 households,  39.30% had children under the age of 18 living with them, 57.80% were married couples living together, 12.20% had a female householder with no husband present, and 25.30% were not families. About 22.50% of all households were made up of individuals, and 9.90% had someone living alone who was 65 years of age or older. The average household size was 2.73, and the average family size was 3.20.

In the county, the age distribution was 30.10% under  18, 10.10% from 18 to 24, 27.30% from 25 to 44, 20.30% from 45 to 64, and 12.20% who were 65 years older. The median age was 33 years. For every 100 females there were 100.30 males. For every 100 females age 18 and over, there were 99.00 males.

Males had a median income of $32,005 versus $20,922 for females. The per capita income for the county was $14,184. About 17.30% of families and 21.10% of the population were below the poverty line, including 28.00% of those under age 18 and 14.90% of those age 65 or over.

2010 census
As of the 2010 census,  64,727 people, 22,236 households, and 16,260 families were living in the county. The 24,919 housing units averaged . The racial makeup of the county was 75.0% White, 4.1%  African American, 1.2% Native American, 0.5% Asian, 0.1% Pacific Islander, 16.6% from other races, and 2.6% from two or more races. Those of Hispanic or Latino origin made up 51.1% of the population. In terms of ancestry, 9.3% were German, 7.6% were Irish, 7.2% were English, and 6.3% were American.

Of the 22,236 households, 41.9% had children under the age of 18 living with them, 52.8% were married couples living together, 13.4% had a female householder with no husband present, 26.9% were not families, and 22.6% of all households were made up of individuals. The average household size was 2.82 and the average family size was 3.30. The median age was 31.9 years.

The median income for a household in the county was $43,910 and for a family was $48,980. Males had a median income of $44,714 versus $25,847 for females. The per capita income for the county was $19,637. About 15.2% of families and 17.7% of the population were below the poverty line, including 23.5% of those under age 18 and 11.1% of those age 65 or over.

Transportation

Airports
These public-use airports are located in the county:
 Lea County Regional Airport (HOB) – Hobbs
 Lea County-Jal Airport (E26) – Jal
 Lea County-Zip Franklin Memorial Airport (E06) – Lovington
 Tatum Airport (18T) – Tatum

Politics
Lea County, like most of the High Plains, eastern New Mexico and west-central Texas, is powerfully Republican. It has repeatedly claimed the status of the most Republican county in New Mexico in Presidential elections. In the 2004 Presidential election, Lea County was the top New Mexico county, as far as percentage, for Republican George W. Bush. He beat John Kerry 79%-20%. In 2008, the Republican candidate John McCain beat Democratic candidate Barack Obama by a wide but slightly smaller margin, 72% to 27%. In 2020, Donald Trump won over 79% of the county's vote, while Joe Biden only received 19%, the worst showing for a Democrat in the county's history. It was Trump's strongest county in New Mexico in the 2020 election. No Democrat has received more than 30% of the county's vote since Bill Clinton in 1996.

However, Lea County was a Democratic stronghold prior to 1968, voting Republican only once in Herbert Hoover's 1928 landslide.

Communities

Cities
 Eunice
 Hobbs
 Jal
 Lovington

Town
 Tatum

Census-designated places
 Monument
 Nadine
 North Hobbs

Other unincorporated communities
 Bennett
Caprock
 Crossroads
 Knowles
 Maljamar
 McDonald

Education
School districts include:
 Eunice Municipal Schools
 Hobbs Municipal Schools
 Jal Public Schools
 Lovington Public Schools
 Tatum Municipal Schools

Notable people
 Roy Cooper. Rodeo cowboy
 Kathy Whitworth, professional golfer
 Brian Urlacher, Chicago Bears football linebacker (2000–2012)

See also
 National Register of Historic Places listings in Lea County, New Mexico

References

 
1917 establishments in New Mexico
Populated places established in 1917